Midland FM (99.1 MHz) is a radio station owned by the Kwara State Broadcasting Corporation in Nigeria. Midland FM was previously known as Radio Kwara 2.

References

Radio stations in Nigeria